Kokang is a region in Myanmar (Burma). It is located in the northern part of Shan State, with the Salween River to its west, and sharing a border with China's Yunnan Province to the east. The capital is Laukkai. Kokang is mostly populated by Kokang Chinese, a Han Chinese group living in Myanmar.

Kokang had been historically part of China for several centuries and is still claimed by the Republic of China to this day, but was largely left alone by successive governments due to its remote location. The region formed a de facto buffer zone between Yunnan province and the Shan States. The Yang clan, originally Ming loyalists from Nanjing, consolidated the area into a single polity. In 1840, the Yunnan governor granted the Yang clan the hereditary rights as a vassal of the Qing dynasty. After the British conquest of Upper Burma in 1885, Kokang was initially placed in China under the 1894 Sino-British boundary convention. It was ceded to British Burma in a supplementary agreement signed in February 1897.

From the 1960s to 1989, the area was controlled by the Communist Party of Burma, and after the party's armed wing disbanded in 1989 it became a special region of Myanmar under the control of the Myanmar Nationalities Democratic Alliance Army (MNDAA). Armed conflicts between the MNDAA and the Tatmadaw have resulted in the 2009 Kokang incident and the 2015 Kokang offensive.

Etymology
The name Kokang derives from the Burmese ကိုးကန့်, which itself derives from the Shan ၵဝ်ႈ (kāo, "nine") + ၵူၼ်း (kúun, "family") or ၵၢင် (kǎang, "guard").

Demographics
In 2009, the population was reported to be around 150,000. Of these, around 100,000 people held Burmese nationality, the remainder being from China. Of the Burmese nationality, 90% are ethnic Han-Chinese, with others being Shan, Palaung, Hmong, Wa, Lisu, Bai and Bamar. The large majority of ethnic Burmans are those dispatched to the region by the central government as military and administrative personnel and their families, primary school teachers, skilled workers, medical workers and other public service personnel. Because of the effective disappearance of the narcotics trade, many have lost their source of income and many local people have left the region.

History

Chiefdom of Kokang

Yang Xiancai founded the state Xingdahu in 1739 in and around Ta Shwe Htan. The name was changed to Kokang by his successors. In 1840, the Yunnan governor granted the Yang clan the hereditary rights as a Tusi of the Qing dynasty. After the British conquest of Upper Burma in 1885, Kokang was initially placed in China under the 1894 Sino-British boundary convention. It was ceded to British Burma in a supplementary agreement signed in February 1897.

Recent history
After the collapse of the Communist Party of Burma in 1989, Kokang was assigned as the autonomous First Special Region of the northern Shan State of Burma.

Peng Jiasheng ruled Kokang since 1989 except he was ousted temporarily by rival Yang Mao-liang in 1992. He regain his power in the same year with the help of juntas but he was ousted again by juntas and replaced with his deputy Bai Xuoqian in 2009.

In 2003, a comprehensive ban on the cultivation of the opium poppy came into effect. Due to the attendant food shortage, among other things, 2003 also saw a large-scale outbreak of malaria in mountain villages with authorities reporting some 279 deaths. During this time the Chinese government sent mobile medical units and supplies to the region, with the United Nations World Food Program also sending disaster relief soon after. In April 2005, the Japan International Cooperation Agency launched a new project to rebuild the lives of farmers in the mountain areas.

The 2008 Myanmar Constitution defines Kokang is a self-administered zone. Kongyan Township and Laukkai Township aka Laukkaing Township are grouped together to form Kokang Self-Administered Zone, which replaced the "First Special Region".

2009 Kokang conflict

In August 2009, Kokang was the site of a violent conflict, the Kokang incident, between junta forces and various ethnic armies. As a result of the conflict the MNDAA lost control of the area and as many as 30,000 refugees fled to Yunnan province in neighboring China.

2015 Kokang offensive

On 17 February 2015 Myanmar president Thein Sein declared a state of emergency and a three-month period of martial law in Kokang in response to fighting between government troops and the Myanmar National Democratic Alliance Army, a Kokang insurgent group.

See also
 Burmese Chinese

References

External links
 Pro-junta government after Aug 8, 2009  
 Government in exile after Aug 8, 2009  
 Map of Kokang
 Kokang Celebrate Liberation from Burmese Communists
 Maps of Kokang
 Chinese Dam Builders Fan Conflict in Burma

 
1739 establishments in Asia
Historical regions